Lančiūnava Manor was a former residential manor in Lančiūnava village, Kėdainiai District Municipality, Lithuania.

References

Manor houses in Lithuania